Cresta is a suburb of Randburg, South Africa, situated near the border of Johannesburg.

Although it is mostly a residential area, in the middle is Cresta Shopping Centre, for which the suburb of Cresta is most well-known.

Cresta is close to the  N1 highway, which passes nearby, as well as Beyers Naude Drive, both main roads to and from the CBD and the Greater Johannesburg area.

References

Johannesburg Region B